The La Barrancosa Dam, formerly known as Jorge Cepernic Dam, is a concrete-face rock-fill dam being built on the Santa Cruz River about  west of Puerto Santa Cruz in Santa Cruz Province, Argentina. It was renamed after the former governor of Santa Cruz Jorge Cepernic. A consortium led by China's Gezhouba Group was awarded the contract to build the Jorge Cepernic Dam and the Néstor Kirchner Dam upstream in August 2013. The consortium will also fund the construction. Both dams are expected to cost nearly US$4.8 billion. It will be built by the firm Electroingeniería, led by Osvaldo Acosta and Gerardo Ferreyra. The primary purpose of the dam is hydroelectric power generation and its power station will have an installed capacity of 600 MW.

In July 2015 machines arrived in Santa Cruz for the construction of the dams.

References

Dams in Argentina
Buildings and structures in Santa Cruz Province, Argentina
Buildings and structures under construction in Argentina
Dams under construction
Concrete-face rock-fill dams